Oediblemma is a genus of moths of the family Erebidae. The genus was erected by George Hampson in 1918.

Species
Oediblemma bjoernstadi Hacker, 2019 Tanzania
Oediblemma caligifusca Hacker, 2019 Kenya, Tanzania
Oediblemma daloana Hacker, 2019 Ivory Coast
Oediblemma ipassa Hacker, 2019 Gabon, Nigeria
Oediblemma ipassina Hacker, 2019 Gabon
Oediblemma kakuma Hacker, 2019 Ghana
Oediblemma kigoma Hacker, 2019 Tanzania
Oediblemma leptinia (Mabille, [1900]) Madagascar
Oediblemma maritima Hacker, 2019 Gabon
Oediblemma nigropuncta Hacker, 2019 Gabon
Oediblemma peregrina Hacker, Fiebig & Stadie, 2019 Ethiopia
Oediblemma poliogyra Hacker, Fiebig & Stadie, 2019 Uganda
Oediblemma trogoptera Hampson, 1918 South Africa, Malawi, Botswana, Mozambique, Zimbabwe

References

External links

Acontiinae